George A. Archer (c. 1850 – November 12, 1932) was an American businessman. He was the co-founder, chief executive officer and chairman of Archer Daniels Midland.

Early life
George A. Archer was born circa 1850 in Dayton, Ohio. His grandfather made linseed oil and his father, William S. Archer, was the owner of a linseed factory in Dayton, where he had co-founded Clegg, Wood & Co. (later known as Wood, Archer & Co.) in 1844.

Career
Archer began his career by working in his father's factory in the 1870s. By 1884, he opened his own linseed factory in Yankton, South Dakota, and founded Archer & Co. Archer moved his business to Minneapolis in 1889, and sold the factory to American Linseed Co.

Archer partnered with John W. Daniels, and they co-founded Archer-Daniels in 1904. When they purchased Midland Linseed Products Co. in 1912, it became known as Archer Daniels Midland. Archer served as its chief executive officer and chairman. The company turned linseed or flaxseed into oil. By the 1930s, the company had become "the largest in the world."

Personal life and death
Archer had a wife, Harriet. They had a son, Shreve, and a daughter, Luella. They resided at Dellwood in White Bear Lake, Minnesota, and they spent their winters in Phoenix, Arizona.

Archer died of pneumonia on November 12, 1932 in White Bear Lake, at the age of 82. He was buried in Dayton, Ohio.

References

1850s births
1932 deaths
People from Dayton, Ohio
People from Saint Paul, Minnesota
Archer Daniels Midland people
19th-century American businesspeople
American company founders
Deaths from pneumonia in Minnesota